Yingkou Lanqi Airport  is an airport serving the city of Yingkou in Liaoning province of Northeast China. The airport opened on 3 February 2016, when the inaugural China Eastern Airlines flight landed from Shanghai Pudong International Airport. The total investment for the project was estimated at CNY 8.94 billion.

Facilities
It has a  terminal building and six aircraft parking aprons. It is designed to handle 750,000 passengers and 4,130 tons of cargo annually by 2020.

Airlines and destinations

See also
List of airports in China
List of the busiest airports in China

References

Airports in Liaoning
Yingkou
Airports established in 2016
2016 establishments in China